Cesare Gallea (23 September 1917 – 11 February 2008) was an Italian footballer who played as a midfielder. On 27 May 1937, he represented the Italy national football team on the occasion of a friendly match against Norway in a 3–1 away win.

References

1917 births
2008 deaths
Italian footballers
Italy international footballers
Association football goalkeepers
Serie A players
Torino F.C. players
Brescia Calcio players
U.S. Alessandria Calcio 1912 players
Modena F.C. managers
U.S. Lecce managers
Italian football managers
A.S.D. Fanfulla managers